Tarati may refer to:

 Tarati, Pakistan, a village in Pakistan
 Tarati, Bangladesh, a subdivision of Muktagacha Upazila, Bangladesh
 Tekeeua Tarati, politician from Kiribati

See also 
 Tatari (disambiguation)